The Marutswa Forest Trail & Boardwalk is situated in the indigenous mist-belt forest near Bulwer in a region called the Midlands of KwaZulu-Natal in South Africa.

History of the Forest

The Marutswa Forest Boardwalk is built on an old logging area harvested in the late 19th century and is named after a local Zulu man called ‘Mahustjwa’ who harvested Sneezewood trees which he sold and were used to build railway sleepers. The lower walk of the contour trail is part of the old logging route which was used by oxen and mules to drag timber for sale in Durban and Pietermaritzburg.

Objective

The Marutswa Forest Trail & Boardwalk, located close to the country village of Bulwer on the R617, is a joint initiative between the SappiWWF TreeRoutes Partnership, the Bulwer Biosphere group, the BirdLife South Africa, the Southern KZN Birding Route and local conservation groups. They have incorporated the site into the route.

The project has so far provided three full-time jobs for local community members as custodians of the project, as well as a welcome platform for local crafters to sell their original and unusual handicrafts from.

The Forest

The site  comprises a network of arterial trails leading into the indigenous forest, where there are a number of lookout jetties boardwalk sections, picnic sites, decks and view points, allowing visitors to view the various layers of the forest, including the canopy.

Animals
Attracted to the pristine forest habitat bushbuck and reedbuck are frequent visitors to the forest, as are a herd of bush pig that freely forage. Rock dassies have been seen and the call of the tree dassie has also been heard in the forest. Very recently mongooses were also seen around the forest boardwalk. Natal dwarf chameleons and several species of butterfly such as the emperor swallowtail can also be found.

Marutswa Forest has been described by some of the South Africa’s top birding tour operators as one of the most active cloud forests in KwaZulu-Natal. The forest is home to a vast number of rare and interesting birds. Cape parrots, sadly endangered and dwindling in numbers in South Africa are attracted by the seeds, and the nesting potential of the plentiful yellow wood trees and are often found in flocks of up to 100 birds in the forest.
Specials to look out for are Cape parrot, orange ground-thrush, African crowned eagle, bush blackcap, white-starred robin, buff-spotted flufftail, Narina trogon, grey cuckooshrike, yellow-throated woodland warbler, crowned and southern ground hornbill.

Plants

Within the forest there are a number of very large and old yellowwoods of about the same age and size, surviving simultaneously because they were too small to harvest for logging during the late 19th century. On the upper contour of the walk old vines are present.

Other species of trees include cabbage trees, white ironwood (Vepris lanceolata), knobthorn (Senegalia nigrescens), black stinkwood, sneezewood, lemonwood, wild currant, wild quince and tree fuchsia (Halleria lucida).

The forest hosts a rich selection of wild plants and grasses including; a large variety of ferns, wild lilies including the spectacular paintbrush lily (Scadoxus puniceus, ground and tree orchids, wild dagga and wild iris.

Nursery and craft and coffee shop

The forest has an indigenous nursery selling plants and tree saplings. The Marustwa craft shop sells items made by crafters from the surrounding communities, including baskets, pots, wire, and woven gifts as well as jewelry and carvings.

External links
 Marutswa forest information

Forests of South Africa